Muerto or Muerta (Spanish for "dead person") may refer to:

 Muerto, California, alternate name of Leliter, California
 La Muerta, Mayan archaeological site
 Isla Muerta (disambiguation) or Isla de Muerta, various fictional locations

See also
 Muerte (disambiguation)
 El Muerto (disambiguation)